...And We Drive is an album by Side Walk Slam, released in 2003 by Tooth & Nail Records.

Critical reception
Exclaim! called the album "an admirable achievement for such a young group, Side Walk Slam seem poised to take back the crown from pop punk's ailing kings."

Track listing

References

2003 albums
Tooth & Nail Records albums
Side Walk Slam albums